Robert Darcy  may refer to:

Robert Darcy (Lincs MP), MP for Lincolnshire (UK Parliament constituency) in 1319
Robert Darcy (died 1448), MP for Essex (UK Parliament constituency), Maldon and Newcastle-upon-Tyne
Robert Darcy, 3rd Earl of Holderness  (1681 – 1721), British peer and politician
Robert Darcy, 4th Earl of Holderness (1718 – 1778), British diplomat and politician